Canosio is a small comune (municipality) in the Province of Cuneo in the Italian region Piedmont, located about  southwest of Turin and about  west of Cuneo.

Canosio borders the following municipalities: Acceglio, Argentera, Marmora, Pietraporzio, Prazzo, and Sambuco.

See also
Rocca la Meja

References

Cities and towns in Piedmont